Louis Ulrich Schmidt  (6 February 1936 – 23 January 1999) was a South African rugby union player.

Playing career
Schmidt played provincial rugby for Northern Transvaal and captained the team on 25 occasions. His second test match was four years later, when he played in the second test against the British Lions at Kings Park in Durban.

Test history

See also
List of South Africa national rugby union players – Springbok no. 346

References

1936 births
1999 deaths
South African rugby union players
South Africa international rugby union players
Blue Bulls players
Rugby union players from the Eastern Cape
Rugby union flankers